This is a timeline documenting events of Jazz in the year 1936

A book called Bud not Buddy is a great recourse for this topic.

Events
 The Duke Ellington Band makes the classical recording of Caravan.

Standards

Deaths

 June
 27 – Mike Bernard, ragtime pianist (born 1875).

 August
 5 – Mitja Nikisch, German pianist and band leader (born 1899).

 Unknown date
 Sam Morgan, New Orleans jazz trumpet player and bandleader (born 1895).

Births

 January
 1 – Sonny Greenwich, Canadian guitarist.
 3 – Joe Haider, German pianist.
 7 – Eldee Young, American upright bass and cello player (died 2007).
 19 – Hod O'Brien, American pianist (died 2016).
 20 – Erwin Helfer, American pianist.
 21 – Snooks Eaglin, American guitarist and singer (died 2009).
 24 – Bobby Wellins, Scottish tenor saxophonist (died 2016).
 31 – Garnett Brown, American trombonist.

 February
 4 – Claude Nobs, Swiss founder and general manager of the Montreux Jazz Festival (died 2013).
 5 – June Tyson, American singer (died 1992).
 13 – Takashi Furuya, Japanese saxophonist and vocalist.
 26 – Colin Purbrook, English pianist, upright bassist, and trumpeter (died 1999).

 March
 2 – Buell Neidlinger, American upright bassist and cellist (died 2018).
 4 – Eric Allandale, Dominican-English trombonist, songwriter, and bandleader (died 2001).
 8 – Gábor Szabó, Hungarian guitarist (died 1982).
 19 – Amancio D'Silva, Indian guitarist and composer (died 1996).
 20 – Harold Mabern, American pianist and composer.
 21
 Brian Dee, British pianist.
 Mike Westbrook, English pianist and composer.
 24 – Kalaparusha Maurice McIntyre, American tenor saxophonist (died 2013).
 25 – Larry Gales, American upright bassist (died 1996).
 27 – Jan Ptaszyn Wróblewski, Polish saxophonist, composer, and arranger.

 April
 3
 Harold Vick, American saxophonist and flautist (died 1987).
 Jimmy McGriff, American organist (died 2008).
 Luiz Eça, Brazilian pianist (died 1992).
 Scott LaFaro, American upright bassist (died 1961).
 6 – Manfred Schoof, German trumpeter.
 13 – Stan Robinson, English tenor saxophonist (died 2017).
 20
 Beaver Harris, American drummer (died 1991).
 Billy James, American drummer (died 2009).
 22 – Don Menza, American saxophonist, arranger, and composer.
 28'' – John Tchicai, Danish saxophonist (died 2012).

 May
 11 – Carla Bley, American composer, pianist, organist and bandleader.
 12 – Klaus Doldinger, German saxophonist.
 13 – Manfredo Fest, Brazilian pianist and keyboardist (died 1999).
 14 – Bobby Darin, American singer (died 1973).
 20 – Rufus Harley, American saxophonist (died 2006).
 26 – Charles Turner, American trumpeter (died 2006).

 June
 4 – Alan Branscombe, English pianist, vibraphonist, and alto saxophonist (died 1986).
 6 – Maysa Matarazzo, Brazilian singer (died 1977).
 12 – Marcus Belgrave, American trumpet player (died 2015).
 14 – Wilson das Neves, Brazilian bossa nova singer and percussionist (died 2017).
 15 – Jan Byrczek, Polish upright bassist, jazz critic, and jazz magazine editor.
 16 – Lin Halliday, American saxophonist (died 2000).
 22 – Hermeto Pascoal, Brazilian flautist, composer, and multi-instrumentalist.
 30 – Dave Van Ronk, American singer (died 2002).

 July
 3 – Corky Hale, American harpist, pianist, flautist, and singer.
 5 – Tommy LiPuma, American music producer (died 2017).
 6 – Chris White, American upright bassist (died 2014).
 13 – Albert Ayler, American saxophonist, singer and composer (died 1970).
 17 – Nick Brignola, American baritone saxophonist (died 2002).
 19 – Carmell Jones, American trumpet player (died 1996).
 22 – Don Patterson, American organist (died 1988).
 28 – Jim Galloway, Scottish clarinetist and saxophonist (died 2014).

 August
 3 – Jack Wilson, American pianist and composer (died 2007).
 6 – Joe Diorio, American guitarist.
 10 – Chuck Israels, American composer, arranger, and upright bassist.
 22 – Lex Humphries, American drummer (died 1994).

 September
 6 – Clifford Thornton, American trumpeter and trombonist (died 1989).
 14 – Rudi Wilfer, Austrian pianist and composer.
 17 – Rolv Wesenlund, Norwegian comedian, singer, clarinetist, and saxophonist (died 2013).
 21 – Sunny Murray, American drummer (died 2017).
 27 – Lars Erstrand, Swedish vibraphonist (died 2009).
 28 – Emmett Chapman, American guitar and Chapman Stick player.

 October
 7 – Sonny Bravo, Afro-Cuban pianist.
 11 – Billy Higgins, American drummer (died 2001).
 12 – Melvin Rhyne, American organist (died 2013).
 13 Shirley Bunnie Foy, American singer, songwriter, and percussionist (died 2016).
 Tom Vaughn, American pianist (died 2011).
 17 – Sathima Bea Benjamin, South African vocalist (died 2013).
 18 – J. C. Moses, American drummer (died 1977).
 25 – Alfredo Rodríguez, Cuban pianist (died 2005).

 November
 18 – Don Cherry, American trumpeter (died 1995).
 28 – Roy McCurdy, American drummer.

 December
 6 – Bill Ashton, British saxophonist and composer.
 7 Arthur Jenkins, American keyboardist and percussionist (died 2009).
 Sonny Phillips, American keyboardist.
 10 John Boudreaux, American drummer (died 2017).
 Martha Mier, American pianist, piano teacher, and composer.
 15 – Eddie Palmieri, Puerto Rican-American pianist and bandleader.
 17 – Tommy Banks, Canadian pianist (died 2018).
 23 – Muhammad Ali, American drummer.
 24 – Chris McGregor, South African pianist, bandleader and composer (died 1990).
 27''' – Mike Barone, American trombonist and big band leader.

 Unknown date
 Byrdie Green, American singer (died 2008).
 Cynthia Crane, American singer.
 Salah Ragab, Egyptian drummer and called the founder Egyptian jazz (died 2008).

References

External links
 History Of Jazz Timeline: 1936 at All About Jazz

Jazz, 1936 In
Jazz by year